The demographics of Quebec constitutes a complex and sensitive issue, especially as it relates to the National question. Quebec is the only province in Canada to feature a francophone (French-speaking) majority, and where anglophones (English-speakers) constitute an officially recognized minority group. According to the 2011 census, French is spoken by more than 85.5% of the population while this number rises to 88% for children under 15 years old. According to the 2011 census, 95% of Quebec are able to conduct a conversation in French, with less than 5% of the population not able to speak French.

In 2013, Statistics Canada had estimated the province's population to be 8,155,334. In the 2016 census, Quebec's population had slightly grown from that estimate to 8,164,361 living in 3,531,663 of its 3,858,943 total dwellings, a 3.3% change from its 2011 population of 7,903,001. Quebec accounts for a little under 23% of the Canadian population. Quebec's demographic weight in Canada has been gradually decreasing since 1971 when, back then, it was 28% of the population. In 2018, Quebec's three most populated regions are Montreal (2,029,379), Montérégie (1,554,282) and Capitale-Nationale (745,135). Quebec's three least populated regions are Nord-du-Québec (45,558), Gaspésie-Îles-de-la-Madeleine (90,709) and Côte-Nord (91,213).

Quebec is home to "one of the world's most valuable founder populations", the Quebec Founder Population.  Founder populations are very valuable to medical genetic research as they are pockets of low genetic variability which provide a useful research context for discovering gene-disease linkages. The Quebec Founder Population arose through the influx of people into Quebec from France in the 17th century to mid-18th century; though this influx was large, a high proportion of the immigrants either died or returned to France, leaving a founder population of approximately 2,600 people.  About seven million Canadians (along with several million French Americans in the United States) are descendants of these original 2,600 colonists.

Vital statistics

Quebec's fertility rate is now higher than the Canadian average. At 1.74 children per woman in 2008, it is above the Canada-wide rate of 1.59, and has increased for five consecutive years, reaching its highest level since 1976. However, it is still below the replacement fertility rate of 2.1 children per woman. This contrasts with its fertility rates before 1960, which were among the highest of any industrialized society. For example, between 1951 and 1961, the population grew nearly 30% with only small net migration (large number of international migrants had settled in Quebec in the preceding period but large numbers of Quebec residents had emigrated to other provinces as well as New England), a natural growth rate matched today only by some African countries.

Although Quebec is home to only 22.0% of the population of Canada, the number of international adoptions in Quebec is the highest of all provinces of Canada. In 2001, 42% of international adoptions in Canada were carried out in Quebec.

Population growth rate: 0.7% (2006)

Birth rate: 9.9% (2005)

Synthetic fertility index: 1.61 (2006)

Death rate: 7.4% (2003)

Net migration rate: 4.1% (2003)

Infant mortality rate: 0.46% (2004)

Stillbirth rate: 3.8% -- 3.5% notwithstanding requested abortions (2002)

Life expectancy: In 2002, life expectancy was 76.3 years for males and 81.9 years for females.

Urbanisation: In 2001, 80.4% of Quebecers lived in urban areas.

Literacy: International Adult Literacy Survey 47% Prose, 42% Document, 40% Quantitative (1996) 
Note: This is not the official literacy rate, and should not be used in comparisons with rates calculated using different procedures.

Marriages: In 2019, 22,250 marriages were celebrated, about 600 less than in 2017 and 2018. These numbers illustrate a continuing trend where marriages are becoming less numerous; in 1970, the number of marriages hit a peak with more than 50,000 celebrations and the number has been slowly decreasing ever since. The average age for marriage is now 33.5 for men and 32.1 for women, an increase of 8.0 and 8.5 years respectively since 1970. 72% of marriages occur on a Saturday. Half of all marriages unite a man and woman with an age gap of 3 years or less. Though they are still uncommon, civil unions are becoming more and more popular.

Demographic growth: In 2019, Quebec registered the highest rate of population growth since 1972 (when quality data began to be recorded), with an increase of 110,000 people, mostly because of the arrival of a high number of non-permanent residents. The number of non-permanent residents has recently sky-rocketed from a little over 100,000 in 2014 to 260,000 in 2019. Quebec's population growth is usually middle-of-the-pack compared to other provinces and very high compared to other developed countries (ex. United States, France, Germany, etc.) because of the federal government of Canada's aggressive immigration policies. Since the 1970s, Quebec has always had more immigrants than emigrants. This can be attributed to international immigration as the number of people moving to Quebec from another province is always lower than the other way around. As of 2019, most international immigrants come from China, India or France.

Education and work: In 2016, 3 out of 10 Québécois possessed a postsecondary degree or diploma. While women were more likely to have a university degree (33% vs 26%) or college degree (21% vs 11%), men were more numerous in having received vocational training. In Quebec, couples where both parents work are far more likely to have children than couples where only one parent works or none of them do.

Households: In Quebec, most people are owners of the property that they live in. The vast majority of couples with or without children are property owners. Most one-person households, however, are renters. Single-parent homes are equally divided between being property owners or renters. From 1996 to 2016, the number of people per household has decreased from an average of 2.5 to 2.25. In 2016, the vast majority of low income households were one-person households. In 2016, 80% of both property owners and renters considered their housing to be "unaffordable".

Population centres

Age structure

Age structure: (2016 census)
{| class="wikitable" 
!Age groups
!Total
!% of Population
!Male
!Female
|-
|0–4 years || 444,930 ||5.45%||227,965 ||216,970
|-
|5–9 years ||469,165 ||5.75%||240,225 ||228,940
|-
|10–14 years ||419,160 ||5.13%||214,345||204,815
|-
|15–19 years ||429,825 ||5.26%||219,070 ||210,755
|-
|20-24 years ||500,100 ||6.13%||252,600 ||247,500
|-
|25-29 years ||495,410	||6.07%||248,030 ||247,380
|-
|30-34 years ||	515,505||6.31%||256,440||259,070
|-
|35–39 years ||550,540||6.74%||274,595||275,945
|-
|40–44 years || 506,525  ||6.20%|| 254,100  || 252,425 
|-
|45–49 years || 519,425 ||6.36%|| 260,410  || 259,015 
|-
|50–54 years || 619,435  ||7.59%|| 309,070  || 310,370 
|- 
|55–59 years || 636,475  ||7.80%|| 314,190  ||322,285
|-
|60–64 years || 562,670  ||6.89%|| 276,140  || 286,535 
|-
|65-69 years ||  488,175 ||5.98%|| 236,395 || 251,775 
|-
|70-74 years || 373,590 ||4.58%|| 176,905 || 196,690 
|-
|75-79 years || 256,905 ||3.15%|| 116,020 || 140,890 
|-
|80-84 years || 187,835 ||2.30%|| 78,390 || 109,450 
|-
|85 years and over || 188,685 ||2.31%|| 61,885  || 126,805 
|-
|Total || 8,164,360  || 100%||4,016,760  || 4,147,605 |}

In 2016, Quebec's median age was 41.2 years old. According to Quebec's age pyramid, the most numerous generation is the baby-boomers that are between 54 and 74 years of age. There are a few other less pronounced peaks, namely in the 1980s, and the one around 2010. A noticeable crater can be observed around the year 2000 because of a record-low amount of births. In 2020, 20.8% of Québécois are less than 20 years old, 59.5% are aged between 20 and 64 years old, and 19.7% are 65 years old or older. In 2019, Quebec witnessed an increase in the number of births compared to the year before (84,200 vs 83,840) and had a replacement rate of about 1.6 per woman. Replacement rates being below 2.1 something that is the norm in industrialised regions like Quebec. Quebec has a higher replacement rate than the Canadian average (1,47). Quebec's rate can also be both higher (ex. Switzerland (1.48), Portugal (1.42), Japan (1.36), Italy (1.29), etc.) or lower (ex. United States (1.73), New Zealand (1.75), Sweden (1.70), England (1.65), etc.) than other industrialised regions'. In Quebec, a lowered rate of giving birth has been mostly observed in people in their 20s. From 30 years of age and onwards, the rate is either increasing or stable. This demonstrates a trend towards wanting to form a family later in life. As of 2020, the average Québécois lifespan is 82.3 years. Between 2010 and 2019, there were between 1000 and 1600 deaths every week, with deaths being at their highest levels in January and their lowest levels in July. In 2021, the region's life expectancy increased after a decline amid the pandemic, reaching 83 years. 

Population history
Population since 1824:

Source: Statistics Canada  
 % Province of Canada population

Ethnic origin

Percentages are calculated as a proportion of the total number of respondents (7,435,905) and may total more than 100 percent due to dual responses. Only groups with 0.06 percent or more of respondents are shown.Ethnicity according to the older more general system of classification is shown below:'Percentages are calculated as a proportion of the total number of respondents (7,125,580) and may total more than 100% due to dual responses Only groups of more than 0.02% are shown

 Future projections 

Visible minorities and Indigenous peoples
The 2016 census counted a total Indigenous population of 182,885 (2.3 percent) including 92,655 First Nations (1.2 percent), 69,365 Métis (0.9 percent), and 13,940 Inuit (0.2 percent). There is an undercount, as some Indian bands regularly refuse to participate in Canadian censuses for political reasons regarding the question of Indigenous sovereignty. In 2016, the Mohawk  reserves of Kahnawake and Doncaster 17 along with the Indian settlement of Kanesatake and Lac-Rapide, a reserve of the Algonquins of Barriere Lake, were not counted.{Percentages are calculated as a proportion of the total number of respondents (7,435,905)}

Approximately 13% of the population of Quebec belongs to a visible minority group, as of the 2016 Canadian census. This is a lower percentage than that of British Columbia, Ontario, Alberta, and Manitoba but higher than that of the remaining five provinces. Most visible minorities in Quebec live in or near Montreal.

The indigenous peoples of Quebec have inhabited the region for several millennia. Each community possesses its own social structure, culture and territorial entity. In 2016, the indigenous population of Quebec numbered 182,885 people. However, because federal law only recognized children of indigenous fathers until the 1980s, the actual number may be higher.

All the ethnicities living primarily south of the 55th parallel are collectively referred to by Québécois as "Amerindians", "Indians", "First Nations" or, obsolete, "Redskins". The ten First Nations ethnic groups in Quebec are linked to two linguistic groups. The Algonquian family is made up of eight ethnic groups: the Abenaki, the Algonquin, the Attikamek, the Cree, the Wolastoqiyik, the Mi'kmaq, the Innu and the Naskapis. These last two formed, until 1978, a single ethnic group: the Innu. The Iroquoian family is made up of the Huron-Wendat and the Mohawks. Only the Mohawks were part of the Iroquois Confederacy (Haudenosaunee), along with five other Indigenous groups from New York State and Ontario. The eleventh indigenous ethnic group in Quebec, the Inuit (or, obsolete, the Eskimos), belong to the Inuit–Aleut family. The Inuit live mainly in Nunavik, Nord-du-Québec (Nouveau Quebec) and make up the majority of the population living north of the 55th parallel.

Of these indigenous peoples, so-called "nomadic" tribes exist, specifically the tribes of Algonquian cultures (eg: the Algonquins, the Cree and the Innu), as well as more "sedentary" ones, specifically the tribes of Iroquoian traditions (eg: the Iroquois and the Hurons-Wendat). The more sedentary groups are the ones who developed more complex forms of social organization. Traditionally, nomadic tribes follow the migration of herds of animals that serve as prey, such as bison, moose or seals. The way of life of the Algonquian and Inuit tribes is dictated by the obligations of hunting and fishing. The traditions of the Iroquoian tribes, producers of the Three Sisters (corn, beans and squash), are instead developed around a matriarchal structure derived from the "long cabin" called a longhouse which houses within it several families under the authority of one dean.

Relations with Québécois

Although they represent today approximately 3% of the Quebec population, the indigenous peoples of Quebec have contributed a lot to Québécois society thanks to their ideals of respect for flora, fauna, nature and the environment as well as thanks to their values of hospitality, generosity and sharing. Economically, through the fur trade and the development of relationships with settlers, including coureurs des bois, merchants, cartographers and Jesuit fathers.

When Europeans arrived in America in the 16th century, the Algonquian-speaking peoples and the St. Lawrence Iroquoians made allies with the French colonists for the purpose of trade. The first connection was made with the arrival of Jacques Cartier when he set foot in Gaspé and met Donnacona, chief of the village of Stadacona (Stadaconé, today, the city of Quebec), in 1534. Moreover, the legend of the Kingdom of Saguenay prompted King Francis I to finance new trips to the New World.

Rights of indigenous people

In the Royal Proclamation of 1763, issued by King George III, the indigenous peoples were stated to have an indisputable right to their lands. However, quickly following the proclamation and after the peace treaties with New France and France concluded, the British Crown decided to institute territorial treaties which allowed British authorities to proceed with the total extinction of the land titles of the Indigenous groups.

Entirely under federal tutelage and direction, indigenous rights were enunciated in the Indian Act and adopted at the end of the 19th century. This act confines First Nations within the Indian reserves created for them. The Indian Act is still in effect today.

In 1975, the Cree, Inuit and the Quebec government agreed to an agreement called the James Bay and Northern Quebec Agreement that would extended Indigenous rights beyond Indian reserves, and to over two-thirds of the Québécois territory. Because this extension was enacted without the participation of the federal government, the extended Indigenous rights only exist in Quebec. In 1978, the Naskapis joined the agreement when the Northeastern Quebec Agreement was signed. As a result, these three ethnic groups were able to break away from their subjugation to the Indian Act.

In recent times, discussions have been underway for several years with the Montagnais of the Côte-Nord and Saguenay–Lac-Saint-Jean for the potential creation of a similar autonomy in two new distinct territories that would be called Innu Assi and Nitassinan. Moreover, in January 2010, an agreement between Quebec City and Montagnais granted the Mashteuiatsh Band Council the ability to plan out development in the entire Ashuapmushuan Wildlife Reserve, which is located on the Nitassinan of the community of the Pekuakamiulnuatsh.

A few political institutions have also been created over time:
 The Assembly of First Nations Quebec-Labrador
 The Grand Council of the Crees
 The Makivik Corporation

Indigenous lands
The following table shows the traditional territories of the First Nations and Inuit peoples who live on the Québécois territory in the basins of the St. Lawrence Valley and James Bay, as well as on the Labrador peninsula.

Acadians

Furthermore, more than a million Québécois wear a patronym of Acadian origin. All of this is because a large number of Acadians had fled Acadia to take refuge in Quebec during the Great Upheaval.

Quebec houses an Acadian community spread out across several regions. Nowadays, Acadians mainly live on the Magdalen Islands and in Gaspesia, but about thirty other communities are present elsewhere in Quebec, mostly in the Côte-Nord and Centre-du-Québec regions. An Acadian community in Quebec can be called a "Cadie" or "Petite Cadie", and some cities and villages use the demonym "Cadien".

The Festival Acadien des Îles-de-la-Madeleine is a festival which occurs every year in memory of the founders of the first villages on the Magdalen Islands. The festival is held in Havre Aubert for about two weeks. There, Québécois and Acadians from all corners of Quebec and other neighbouring lands mingle to celebrate Acadian culture. The town of Bonaventure, in Gaspesia, also houses the Musé Acadien du Québec which features permanent exhibitions on Acadians in Quebec, like Une Acadie québécoise and Secrets d'Acadiens, les coulisses de la rue Grand-Pré. In 2002, on National Acadian Day, the Commission de la capitale nationale du Québec unveiled a monument to Acadians entitled "Towards the Light". The monument symbolizes and explains the predominant role that the Acadians and their descendants played in the history of Quebec. The Premier of Quebec, Bernard Landry, declared at this unveiling that: 

Languages

Quebec differs from other Canadian provinces in that French is the only official and preponderant language, while English predominates in the rest of Canada. French is the common language, understood and spoken by 94.46% of the population. Quebec is the only Canadian province whose population is mainly Francophone; 6,102,210 people (78.1% of the population) recorded it as their sole native language in the 2011 Census, and 6,249,085 (80.0%) recorded that they spoke it most often at home. Knowledge of French is widespread even among those who do not speak it natively; in 2011, about 94.4% of the total population reported being able to speak French, alone or in combination with other languages.

A considerable number of Quebec residents consider themselves to be bilingual in French and English. In Quebec, about 42.6% of the population (3,328,725 people) report knowing both languages; this is the highest proportion of bilinguals in any Canadian province. The federal electoral district of Lac-Saint-Louis, located in the Bilingual Belt, is the most bilingual area in the province with 72.8% of its residents claiming to know English and French, according to the 2011 census. In contrast, in the rest of Canada, in 2006, only about 10.2 percent (2,430,990) of the population had a knowledge of both of the country's official languages.

The Quebec government defends the French language and the Francophonie in the face of the mostly English-dominated rest of North America. The Gendron Commission report of 1968 established the foundations for the white book of the government of Quebec' linguistic policy. Dependent on commissions of inquiry, this policy statement is also accompanied the Charter of the French language -or "Bill 101"- since 1977. 

French

French is the official language of Quebec. Québécois French is the most widely used variant. The Office québécois de la langue française oversees the application of the linguistic policy on the territory jointly with the Superior Council of the French Language and the Commission de toponymie du Québec. Through its linguistic recommendations, the GDT fights against the invasion of Frenglish into the French language.

The French settlers who settled in New France came largely from the western and northern provinces of France. They generally spoke a variety of regional languages of the Oïl language family. Thus, creating the need for the colonists to "unify their patois" ("unite their dialects") and creating Quebec French. Québécois French became the vehicular language of New France, and it remained as such until the British's conquest of New France.

Early on, colonists borrowed words from Algonquin, a language they frequently interacted with, often to name and describe new aspects of geography, temperature, fauna or flora not present in the Old World. Then, Quebec French's evolution was affected by the  due to the arrival of the King's daughters. These 800 women were mostly orphaned girls that had been adopted by the state as part of a program sponsored by King Louis XIV, and been educated in convents to become exemplary settlers and wives. Once their training was complete, between 1663 and 1673, they were sent to New France and married among the colonists, instilling the King's French into the population in the process.

In his 1757 Memoir on the State of New France, Bougainville writes: 

The British conquest of 1759 turned the evolution of French in Quebec and North America upside down. By having ties severed with France, the French spoken in Quebec definitively separated from the French spoken in metropolitan France. Quebec French was then truly born, retaining the peculiarities of the old languages of Oïl (which were almost extinct in France at that point) and the King's French, and being both influenced and threatened by the language of the new English conquerors. Quebec's French continued to evolve in its own direction, retaining some aspects the non-isolated rest of the French-speaking world lost, and, over time, new influences and remoteness formed the regional accents and different dialects of Quebec French.

Canada is estimated to be home to between 32 and 36 regional French accents, 17 of which can be found in Quebec. There are 11 accents exclusive to mainland Quebec; they are the regional accents of Gaspé (Gaspésien), Bas-Saint-Laurent, Saguenay-Lac Saint-Jean (Saguenéen), Quebec-Charlevoix, Beauce (Beauceron), the Eastern Townships, Mauricie-Haute-Mauricie (Magoua), Greater Montreal, Eastern Montreal-Laval, Rouyn-Noranda and Côte-Nord. There are 4 accents off the mainland, 1 on the Isle-aux-Coudres, and 3 on the Îles-de-la-Madeleine: the accents of Villages Medelinots, Havre-aux-Maisons, and Havre-Aubert. Finally, there are 2 accents that cross provincial borders: the accents of Outaouais-Eastern Ontario (Outaouais) and Témiscouata-Madawaska (Brayon). There are also people in Quebec who will naturally speak using Standard Québécois or Joual, both of which are considered sociolects rather than regional accents.

Fragility and protection of French

During the days of New France, there began to be an extremely pronounced demographic increase of anglophones versus francophones in North America, a trend which continues to this day. In 1700, for every 250,000 English-speakers, there was 16,500 French-speakers.

After the conquest of 1759, this reality became more brutal for Quebec, which now had to avoid assimilation by the British Empire's regime and survive culturally as well as linguistically.

Still today, as French's demographic weight on the continent and in Canada continues to decline, Quebec faces the threat of assimilation. Since 2011, the population with French as their mother tongue on the Island of Montreal, Quebec's metropolis, has fallen below 50%, with only 49% of the population being francophone due to a sharp increase in the immigrant allophone population (whose mother tongue is neither French nor English).

Efforts have been made to preserve the primacy of the French language in Quebec. Such efforts include: instating the Charter of the French language, Quebec's participation in the Francophonie since 1971, French immigration to Quebec, etc. Several institutions seek to protect and promote French such as the Office québécois de la langue française, the Superior Council of the French Language, the Commission de toponymie du Québec, etc.

English
As of 2011, English is the mother tongue of nearly 650,000 Quebecers (8% of the population). These anglophones, sometimes called Anglo-Québécois, constitute the second largest linguistic group in Quebec. In addition, in 2001, roughly 50,000 people (0.7% of the population) considered their mother tongue to be both French and English. According to the latest censuses of 2001, 2006, 2011 and 2016, the percentage of anglophones in the population has more or less stabilized, but in absolute numbers, they are constantly increasing. Allophones, on the other hand, are increasing sharply in absolute numbers as well as in percentage. According to the 2016 census, 49.1% of people living in Quebec say they can conduct a conversation in English (English as mother tongue or as a second language). As for French-English bilingualism, 44.5% of people in Quebec state that they are bilingual, that is to say, able to conduct a conversation in both French and English.

English made its first appearance in Quebec in 1760, when the British invaded and conquered Canada (New France). Shortly afterwards, the first English and Scottish merchants came to settle in the cities of Québec City and Montreal. In 1784, United Empire Loyalists flooded Quebec following their expulsion from the Thirteen Colonies during the United States' War of Independence. This dramatically increased the number of English speakers in Quebec. These Loyalists, avoiding the French-speaking and Catholic countryside, settled mainly in then underdeveloped regions, such as the Eastern Townships and the Outaouais. The proclamation of the Act of Union of 1840 caused massive immigration from the British Isles to the Québécois territory, which introduced Celtic languages for the first time and increased the power of English. The influence of English and repeated attempts at linguistic assimilation of the French-speaking population had and continues to have a considerable impact on French-language culture in Quebec. Today, Anglo-Quebecers reside mainly in the west of the island of Montreal (West Island), downtown Montreal and the Pontiac.

Anglophones in Quebec have several institutions and infrastructural systems. At the school level, anglophones in Quebec have several school boards grouped together into the Association des commissions scolaire anglophones du Québec. In terms of media, anglophones own, among others, the Montreal Gazette in Montreal, and the Chronicle-Telegraph in Quebec City. Other organisations include the Quebec Writers' Federation, which is a group of English-speaking Quebec authors, and the Voice of English-speaking Quebec, which represents the interests of the English-speaking community in the Québec region.

Other languages
The term "allophone" is used to refer to people whose mother tongue is neither French nor English. We can distinguish two groups of allophones: people who speak indigenous languages, and those who speak so-called immigrant languages.

In the 2016 census, where one could note more than one language as their mother tongue, Quebec had 1,171,045 people (14.5% of the population) who reported a mother tongue that was neither French nor English, and 1,060,830 people (13.2% of the population) who did not declare French or English as a mother tongue at all. In this census, 47,025 (0.6% of the population) reported an aboriginal language as a mother tongue, while 1,124,020 (13.9% of the population) reported an immigrant language as a mother tongue.

Indigenous languages

Three families of aboriginal languages exist in Quebec, which encompass eleven languages. Each of these languages belong to and are spoken by members of a specific ethnic group. Sometimes, the language in question is spoken natively by all members of the group, sometimes they are spoken only by a few individuals. These languages are also sometimes sub-divided into different dialects in the indigenous communities.

 Algonquian language family
 Abenaki (spoken by the Abenakis of Centre-du-Québec)
 Algonquin (spoken by the Algonquins of the Outaouais)
 Maliseet-passamaquoddy (spoken by the Maliseet of Bas-Saint-Laurent)
 Mi'kmaq (spoken by the Micmacs of Gaspésie and the Magdalen Islands)
 the linguistic continuum of:
 Atikamekw (spoken by the Attikameks of Lanaudière and Mauricie)
 Cree (spoken by the Crees of Nord-du-Québec)
 Innu-aimun (spoken by the Innu-Montagnais of the Côte-Nord and Saguenay-Lac-Saint-Jean)
 Naskapi (spoken by the Innu-Naskapi of the Côte-Nord)
 Inuit-Aleut language family
 Nunavimmiutitut (Inuktitut dialect spoken by the Inuit of Nord-du-Québec)
 Iroquoian language family
 Mohawk, also known as "agnier" (spoken by the Iroquois-Mohawks of Montérégie and the Laurentides)
 Wendat (spoken by the Huron-Wendat of the Capitale-Nationale)

In the 2016 census, 50,895 people in Quebec said they knew at least one indigenous language. Furthermore, 45,570 people declared having an aboriginal language as their mother tongue. For 38,995 of them, it was the language most frequently spoken at home. Additionally, 1,195 people who did not have an aboriginal language as their mother tongue reported using an aboriginal language most often at home.

In Quebec, most indigenous languages are currently transmitted quite well from one generation to the next with a mother tongue retention rate of 92%.

Immigrant languages

In the 2016 census, 1,124,020 people declared having an immigrant language as their mother tongue in Quebec. The most cited languages are Arabic (2.5% of the total population), Spanish (1.9%), Italian (1.4%), Creole languages (mainly Haitian Creole) (0.8%) and Mandarin (0.6%).

Both the number and proportion of allophones have been increasing in Quebec since the 1951 census.

In 2015, the vast majority (89%) of young allophone students in Quebec attended French-language schools.

Mother tongue language

Language spoken at home

Knowledge of languages

The question on knowledge of languages allows for multiple responses. The following figures are from the 2021 Canadian Census and the 2016 Canadian Census, and lists languages that were selected by at least one per cent of respondents. 

Religion

Religion, more precisely the Roman Catholic Church, has long occupied a central and integral place in Quebec society since the arrival of the first French settlers in New France. However, since the Quiet Revolution and the Second Vatican Council in the 1960s, there has been a real separation between state and religion, and society in general sees religion as a private matter. 

From the beginning of Canada, and throughout French-Canadian history, catholicism and the Catholic Church have played a preponderant role in the social and political development of Quebec.

The first Québécois mass was celebrated by the priest accompanying Jacques Cartier on his voyage to the New World in 1535. Amerindians were evangelized by Catholic missionaries before the founding of parishes. In 1627, Cardinal Richelieu recited a royal proclamation by Louis XIII which banished all non-Catholics, including Huguenots, from New France. In 1658, the apostolic vicariate of Quebec was founded, followed by the Archdiocese of Quebec in 1674. The archbishop of Quebec, who today is the primate of the Catholic Church of Canada, was once part of the Sovereign Council of New France.

The extraordinary power that the Catholic Church once had in Quebec is reflected in all areas of culture, from language to the fine arts, theater, literature and film. The golden age for ecclesiastics would come in the mid-nineteenth century (around 1840) as this was a period during which the Church, influenced by ultramontanism, concretized its influence (see Clericalism in Quebec). The influence of the Church began to wane a hundred years later, when, after the Grande Noirceur, Quebec society was profoundly transformed by the Quiet Revolution. Created in 1966, the  deals with current issues concerning ethical and moral values (ex. gay marriage, euthanasia and abortion).

Several holy men and women from Quebec have been recognized for their venerable actions and canonized as saints:
 Saint Brother André Bessette canonized in 2010 by Pope Benedict XVI.
 Saint Kateri Tekakwitha canonized on October 21, 2012 by Pope Benedict XVI.
 Saint Mary of the Incarnation canonized in 2014 by Pope François.
 Saint François de Laval canonized in 2014 by Pope François.

Protestantism, a practice consisting of reformed catholicism, has been present in Quebec for a long time. From the very beginning of Canada, several Huguenots of the calvinist religion were present in Quebec. Huguenots have been identified in almost all classes of society: settlers, fishermen, daughters of the king, etc. During the early French Regime, the number of protestant immigrants was estimated to be 1,450 people. In 1627, protestantism became no longer tolerated in New France. After Quebec fell under British rule, the protestant religion, more particularly of the anglican faith, became a religion tolerated on Quebecois territory again. This was because the English immigrants who came to certain regions of Quebec followed this religion.

The  preceded Catholicism in Quebec.

While the first synagogue was established in Montreal in 1777, Jews remained a negligible religious group in Quebec until the early 20th century when a wave of Jewish immigrants settled in Montreal. The Jewish community of today, established mainly on the island of Montreal, now numbers about 120,000 people. In 2010, this community was made up of 26.1% traditionalist Jews, 24.3% orthodox, 15.2% conservative, 9% reconstructionist and reformist, and 25.4% of Montreal Jews say they have no religious affiliation. In the 20th century, successive waves of immigrants from Africa, Asia, Greece, Ireland and Italy settled in Montreal, bringing their cultural and religious customs. Some religious communities, such as Eastern Christians, then established places of worship.
 Religion and Politics 

Many aspects of life for French-speaking Quebeckers remained dominated by the Catholic Church in the decades following 1867. The Church operated many of the institutions of the province, including most French-language schools, hospitals, and charitable organizations. The leader of the Catholic Church in Quebec was the Bishop of Montreal, and from 1840 to 1876 this was Ignace Bourget, an opponent of liberalism. Bourget eventually succeeded in gaining more influence than the liberal, reformist Institut Canadien. At his most extreme, Bourget went so far as to deny a Church burial to Joseph Guibord, a member of the Institut, in 1874. A court decision forced Bourget to allow Guibord to be buried in a Catholic cemetery, but Bourget deconsecrated the burial plot of ground, and Guibord was buried under army protection. The conservative approach of the Catholic Church was the major force in Quebec society until the reforms of the Quiet Revolution during the 1960s. In 1876, Pierre-Alexis Tremblay was defeated in a federal by-election because of pressure from the Church on voters, but succeeded in getting his loss annulled with the help of a new federal law. He quickly lost the subsequent election. In 1877, the Pope sent representatives to force the Quebecois Church to minimize its interventions in the electoral process.

Lionel Groulx wanted to build a nationalistic French-Canadian identity, in purpose to protect the power of the Church and dissuade the public from popular-rule and secularist views.  Groulx propagated French-Canadian nationalism and argued that maintaining a Roman Catholic Quebec was the only means to 'emancipate the nation against English power.'  He believed the powers of the provincial government of Quebec could and should be used within Confederation, to bolster provincial autonomy (and thus Church power), and advocated it would benefit the French-Canadian nation economically, socially, culturally and linguistically.  Groulx successfully promoted Québécois nationalism and the ultra-conservative Catholic social doctrine, to which the Church would maintain dominance in political and social life in Quebec.  In the 1920s–1950s, this form of traditionalist Catholic nationalism became known as clerico-nationalism.

During the 1940s and 1950s Quebec Premier Maurice Duplessis party, the Union Nationale, often had the active support of the Roman Catholic Church during political campaigns, using the slogan Le ciel est bleu; l'enfer est rouge ("Heaven is blue; hell is red"; red is the colour of the Liberal party, and blue was the colour of the Union Nationale).
 Churches 

The oldest parish church in North America is the Cathedral-Basilica of Notre-Dame de Québec. Its construction began in 1647, when it was then known under the name Notre-Dame-de-la-Paix, and it was finished in 1664. Its first mass was celebrated by Father Vimont on December 24, 1650. This church obtained the status of cathedral in 1674, when François de Laval became archbishop of Quebec, and then the status of minor basilica in 1874. It was also rebuilt twice after the siege of Quebec in 1759 and the fire of 1922.

The most frequented place of worship in Quebec is the Basilica of Sainte-Anne-de-Beaupré. This basilica welcomes millions of visitors each year, especially during the novena of Saint Anne, on July 26. The Sainte-Anne-de-Beaupré basilica is recognized for its numerous miracles, which is why thousands of crutches can be found at its entrance.

Saint Joseph's Oratory is the largest place of worship in the world dedicated to Saint Joseph. Located beside Mount Royal, it is known for its 283 steps, which pilgrims come to climb on their knees every year, reciting a prayer on each of the steps.

Many pilgrimages include places such as Saint Benedict Abbey, Notre-Dame de Montréal Basilica, Marie-Reine-du-Monde de Montréal Basilica-Cathedral, Saint-Michel Basilica-Cathedral, Saint-Patrick's Basilica, etc.

Another important place of worship in Quebec is the anglican Holy Trinity Cathedral, which was erected between 1800 and 1804. It was the first anglican cathedral built outside the British Isles.

In August 2019, the Minister of Culture, Nathalie Roy, announced the allocation of $15 million to preserve the cultural heritage that the churches of Quebec embody, and $5 million for the requalification of places of worship.

 Migration 
 Immigration 

The 2021 census reported that immigrants (individuals born outside Canada) comprise 1,210,595 persons or 14.6 percent of the total population of Quebec.

 Recent immigration 
The 2021 Canadian census counted a total of 202,740 people who immigrated to Quebec between 2016 and 2021.

 Interprovincial migration 
Since it began being recorded in 1971 until 2018, each year Quebec has had negative interprovincial migration, and among the provinces it has experienced the largest net loss of people due to the effect. Between 1981 and 2017, Quebec lost 229,700 people below the age of 45 to interprovincial migration. Per capita, Quebec has lost significantly fewer people than other provinces. This is due to the large population of the province and the very low migration rate of francophone Quebeckers. However, Quebec receives much fewer than average in-migrants from other provinces.

In Quebec, allophones are more likely to migrate out of the province than average: between 1996 and 2001, over 19,170 migrated to other provinces; 18,810 of whom migrated to Ontario.Source: Statistics CanadaSee also

Demographics of Canada
Demographic history of Quebec
Demolinguistics of Quebec
Demographics of MontrealCahiers québécois de démographie'' academic journal
Immigration to Canada
Population of Canada by province and territory

References

External links
Institut de la statistique du Québec
Statistics Canada
PopulationData.net

Quebec
Quebec society